Kalolo E. Tuiloma (born 24 June 1990) is a New Zealand born Samoan rugby union player who currently plays for Rugby New York in Major League Rugby (MLR). His position is Tighthead prop.

Early career

Born in Wellington, but raised in the suburbs of Auckland, Tuiloma originally played in the number eight position for Aorere College before heading south to complete his schooling at Timaru Boys' High School.   He played Heartland Championship rugby with 
South Canterbury in 2013, however soon after his career went on a downward spiral.   Unable to crack the  ITM Cup team, he turned to food and alcohol and saw his weight balloon to 181 kg.

Seeking help he moved back to the Auckland area to be closer to his family and joined the Bombay Rugby club who were at the time coached by Darryl Suasua.   Suasua saw Tuiloma's potential to be a prop forward and began converting him from a loose forward to a front rower.   While at Bombay, he helped them to win the McNamara Cup, Counties Manukau's Premier club competition in both 2014 and 2015.

Senior career

Tuiloma was first named in the Counties Manukau Steelers squad ahead of the 2016 Mitre 10 Cup where he again linked up with former Bombay coach Darryl Suasua, who was now in charge of the Steelers. Preseason injuries to experienced front row pair Pauliasi Manu and Nepo Laulala opened the door for Tuiloma, who quickly cemented himself as a regular starter in the number 3 jersey.

In October 2016, it was announced that Tuiloma would take up a 7 month contract with French side Grenoble where he would serve as an injury replacement until the end of the 2016–17 season.

In December 2021 he signed a deal to return to Major League Rugby with Rugby New York for the 2022 Major League Rugby season.

References

1990 births
Living people
Samoan rugby union players
People educated at Aorere College
People educated at Timaru Boys' High School
Rugby union props
Counties Manukau rugby union players
FC Grenoble players
South Canterbury rugby union players
New Zealand sportspeople of Samoan descent
Highlanders (rugby union) players
Utah Warriors players
Northland rugby union players
Samoa international rugby union players
Rugby New York players
North Harbour rugby union players